Dictyna volucripes is a species of mesh web weaver in the spider family Dictynidae. It is found in North America.

Subspecies
These two subspecies belong to the species Dictyna volucripes:
 (Dictyna volucripes volucripes) Keyserling, 1881
 Dictyna volucripes volucripoides Ivie, 1947

References

External links

 

Dictynidae
Articles created by Qbugbot
Spiders described in 1881